The 2018 National League play-off Final , known as the Vanarama National League Promotion Final for sponsorship reasons, was a football match played at Wembley Stadium in London on 12 May 2018 to decide the second team to be promoted from the National League to EFL League Two for the 2018–19 season. The culmination of the 2018 National League play-offs saw Tranmere Rovers beat Boreham Wood to earn promotion alongside the National League champions Macclesfield Town.	

Boreham Wood entered the play-offs having finished fourth in the 2017–18 National League while Tranmere Rovers finished two places above in second. The play-off format was changed for this season with second and third place teams receiving a bye to the semi-finals while the fourth to seventh place teams played a qualifying round to determine the other two semi-finalists. Boreham Wood beat seventh-placed AFC Fylde 2–1 in their qualifying round and third-placed Sutton United 3–2 in the semi-final. Tranmere faced sixth-placed Ebbsfleet United in their semi-final, after Ebbsfleet beat Aldershot Town in the other qualifying round via a penalty-shootout, Tranmere won 4–2 to reach the final.

After only 54 seconds, Tranmere's Liam Ridehalgh was sent off for a two-footed challenge on Ricky Shakes.  Nonetheless, Andy Cook soon scored to give Tranmere the lead.  Rovers quickly sent on substitute Eddie Clarke, a specialist left-back.  They then had to make another substitution, Connor Jennings for Josh Ginnelly, after Ginnelly was hit by a glass bottle thrown by a Boreham Wood fan. Just before half-time, Rovers had to make their final substitution because of injury.  Bruno Andrade immediately equalised.

After 80 minutes, the substitute Jennings crossed for James Norwood to score the winning goal for Tranmere.

Match

Details

References

play-off Final 2018
2018
Play-off Final 2018
Play-off Final 2018
Events at Wembley Stadium
National League play-off final
National League play-off Final